The flag of the state of Nebraska is a blue rectangular cloth charged with a variation of the Nebraskan state seal. The current design was commissioned in 1925, when the Nebraska legislature passed a bill stating that the flag would consist of the state seal in gold and silver on a field of blue.

History
The seal that appears on the flag was designed in 1867. The seal appeared on unofficial state banners prior to 1925, sometimes on a field of yellow.

Several unsuccessful attempts have been made to change the seal. One attempt was made by the architect of the Nebraska State Capitol, Bertram Goodhue. The legislature rejected Goodhue's redesign in 1925, and ratified the existing state seal "on a field of national blue" as the state banner. The official design was first displayed at a 1926 New Year's Day celebration at the Nebraska State Capitol.

The official designation of the design as the state flag (rather than a banner) occurred in 1963; Nebraska was one of the last states to adopt an official flag.

The Nebraskan flag was rated in a survey by the North American Vexillological Association as the second-worst of 72 U.S. and Canadian flags. The worst-ranked flag at the time, the flag of Georgia, has since been changed. In 2002, the Nebraska Legislature's Government, Military and Veterans Affairs Committee discussed a bill to create a commission for suggesting new designs to the Legislature. The flag was not changed. In 2017, State Senator Burke Harr proposed a task force charged with redesigning the flag, citing the fact that the flag had flown upside down at the capitol for 10 days with no one noticing. Harr wished for the redesign to come through by the State's 150th anniversary. The State Senate committee declined to take action.

Gallery

See also
List of Nebraska state symbols
Seal of Nebraska

References

External links

 Nebraska Secretary of State, History of the Nebraska State Flag

United States state flags
Flag
Flags introduced in 1925